Hill of Stake is a hill on the boundary between North Ayrshire and Renfrewshire, Scotland.

Geography 
The hill is 522 metres (1712 feet) high and is the highest point of the relatively low-lying county of Renfrewshire and indeed the entire Clyde Muirshiel Regional Park of which it is a part, having a considerable Topographic isolation.

History 
Around the hill in the past several planes crashed due to bad weather condition.; among them in 1938 is recorded a crash of a Spartan Cruiser and in 1947 of a Seafire.

Notes

External links
 
 Hill of Stake on Geograph.org.uk

Marilyns of Scotland
Mountains and hills of Renfrewshire
Mountains and hills of North Ayrshire
Hills of the Scottish Midland Valley
Highest points of historic Scottish counties